Lalit Mansingh (born 29 April 1941) is a former Indian diplomat. He was the Foreign Secretary of India from 1999 to 2000, and Indian Ambassador to the United States from 2001 to 2004. Prior to this, he was Indian High Commissioner to the United Kingdom from 1998 to 99. Lalit Mansingh is the son of Odia poet and educationist Mayadhar Mansingh.

Early life and education
Mansingh was born and brought up in Odisha as the middle son of Odia poet Mayadhar Mansingh. He was born at Nandala, in Puri district of Odisha. He graduated with a master's degree in Political Science, receiving a gold medal for being top of the class. He was a Research scholar and Faculty for short period in American Studies Programme at the  School of International Studies in Jawaharlal Nehru University, New Delhi. He was married to Odissi dancer Sonal Mansingh. The couple is now divorced.

Career

Lalit Mansingh has remained a lecturer in the Post-Graduate Department of Political Science, Utkal University in Bhubaneswar, Odisha. He joined Indian Foreign Service (IFS) officer, in June 1963 and was the topper of his batch. He became High Commissioner to Nigeria (1993–95) and Ambassador to the United Arab Emirates (1980–83) and in Nigeria with concurrent accreditation to Benin, Chad and The Cameroons. Apart from that he also served in various diplomatic capacities in Geneva, Afghanistan and Belgium.

He was Deputy Chief of Mission in Washington, DC, 1989–92 and remained the Dean of Foreign Service Institute, India, from 1995 to 1996., apart from serving as Director-General of the Indian Council for Cultural Relations (ICCR), Joint Secretary in the Ministry of Finance and Secretary (West) in the Ministry of External Affairs .

Mansingh is a member of an international group called the Non Official Group of Friends (NGF) of Sri Lanka which aims at assisting that country in its post-conflict reconstruction and reconciliation.  He is part of a Track II dialogue between India and Pakistan focusing on confidence building measures between the two nuclear armed neighbors.

Other engagements - 
Overseas:
Member, Board of Trustees, International Crisis Group, Brussels; Member, Asia Pacific Leadership Network, Canberra; Member, International Advisory Council, APCO Worldwide, Washington D.C.and International Advisory Council Member in APCO Worldwide

In India:
Chairman World Cultural Forum India; President, India Strategic Forum, Vice President, Maha Bodhi Society of India; Chairman, Political Science Association, Ravenshaw University; Vice President of the Indian Council for Cultural Relations (ICCR), Prof Emeritus at the Foreign Service Institute of India; Member, Governing Body of Development Alternatives, New Delhi and Gram Vikas, Odisha.

He is also Diplomatic Advisor to the Federation of Indian Chamber of Commerce and Industry (FICCI) and Chairman, FICCI India-US Policy Group.

He was awarded the Kharavela Samman (Kharavela Award) by Odisha Governor in February 2009

Speech and transcription
 Valedictory address delivered by Ambassador Lalit Mansingh, former Foreign Secretary in a seminar on Tibet in the Aftermath of Devolution of Political Authority at VIF India

Further reading
 Selected Speeches, Remarks & Letters of Ambassador Lalit Mansingh
 Lalit Singh Mansingh Interview

See also 
 Parikud
 Syed Akbaruddin

References

External links
 Ministry of External Affairs, Official website
 Lalit Mansingh Quotes
 Lalit Mansingh: From us to US The Times of India

1941 births
Living people
Delhi University alumni
High Commissioners of India to the United Kingdom
Ambassadors of India to the United States
Ambassadors of India to the United Arab Emirates
Ambassadors of India to Nigeria
Ambassadors of India to Chad
Ambassadors of India to Benin
Ambassadors of India to Cameroon
Indian Foreign Secretaries
Politicians from Bhubaneswar